The Basilicata regional election of 1970 took place on 7–8 June 1970.

Events
Christian Democracy was by far the largest party, gaining almost twice the share of vote of the Italian Communist Party, which came distantly second. After the election Christian Democrat Vincenzo Verrastro was elected President of the Region.

Results

Source: Ministry of the Interior

Elections in Basilicata
1970 elections in Italy